Theodosius II served as Greek Patriarch of Alexandria in the 12th century (exact dates are unknown).

References 

12th-century Patriarchs of Alexandria
Melkites in the Fatimid Caliphate